Júlio César de Oliveira Martins (born 13 December 1983 in Jaboatão dos Guararapes), known as Júlio César, is a Brazilian footballer.

Football career
Júlio César began his career in his native Pernambuco, helping Serrano Futebol Clube (PE) to the Campeonato Pernambucano of 2005. In August 2005 he left his country and moved to Clube Atlético de Valdevez in Portugal, playing three seasons in the third division; in 2006–07 he started on loan to level two club Desportivo de Chaves, but finished the season in the same predicament in the division below, with S.C. Lusitânia.

In January 2009 César signed a -year contract with first division club Académica de Coimbra, making his competition debut on 8 February in a 0–1 loss at Rio Ave FC (45 minutes played).

In July 2009 he again left for the second level of Portuguese football, joining Desportivo das Aves on loan, and remaining there for two seasons. He played as a regular for the northern club, using Júlio Martins as his shirt name.

Honours
Académica de Coimbra
Taça de Portugal: 2011–12

References

External links
CBF data 

Portuguese League profile 

1983 births
Living people
Sportspeople from Pernambuco
Brazilian footballers
Association football midfielders
Brazilian expatriate footballers
Expatriate footballers in Portugal
Brazilian expatriate sportspeople in Portugal
G.D. Chaves players
Liga Portugal 2 players
S.C. Lusitânia players
Associação Académica de Coimbra – O.A.F. players
Primeira Liga players
C.D. Aves players
Moreirense F.C. players
C.D. Feirense players
Clube Oriental de Lisboa players
G.D. Vitória de Sernache players
Al-Shabab SC (Kuwait) players
Kuwait Premier League players
Expatriate footballers in Kuwait
Brazilian expatriate sportspeople in Kuwait
S.U. 1º Dezembro players